Sea Horses is a 1925 novel by the British writer Francis Brett Young.

Adaptation
In 1926 the novel was made into a silent film Sea Horses by American studio Paramount Pictures. Directed by Allan Dwan and starring Jack Holt, Florence Vidor and William Powell, it is now considered a lost film.

References

Bibliography
 Hall, Michael. Francis Brett Young. Seren, 1997.
 Goble, Alan. The Complete Index to Literary Sources in Film. Walter de Gruyter, 1999.

External links
 

1925 British novels
Novels by Francis Brett Young
British novels adapted into films
Cassell (publisher) books